C.H. Simmons (full name and dates of birth and death unknown) was an English cricketer.  Simmons' batting and bowling styles are unknown.

Simmons made a single first-class appearance for Sussex against Oxford University at the County Ground, Hove in 1920.  In his match, he bowled six overs as an opening bowler in Oxford University's first-innings, though didn't take any wickets.  In Sussex's first-innings, he was dismissed for a duck by Greville Stevens.  In Oxford University's second-innings, Simmons took the wicket of Romilly Holdsworth, finishing with figures of 1/18 from five overs.  He was again dismissed for a duck in Sussex's second-innings, this time being bowled first-ball by Raymond Robertson-Glasgow.  Oxford University won a close match by 8 runs.  This was his only major appearance for Sussex.

References

External links
C.H. Simmons at ESPNcricinfo
C.H. Simmons at CricketArchive

English cricketers
Sussex cricketers